Going Postal is a fantasy novel by British writer Terry Pratchett, the 33rd book in his Discworld series, released in the United Kingdom on 25 September 2004. Unlike most of Pratchett's Discworld novels, Going Postal is divided into chapters, a feature previously seen only in Pratchett's children's books and the Science of Discworld series. These chapters begin with a synopsis of philosophical themes, in a similar manner to some Victorian novels and, notably, to Jules Verne stories. The title refers to both the contents of the novel, as well as to the term 'going postal'.

The book was on the shortlist for both the Nebula and Locus Awards for Best (Fantasy) Novel. It would also have been shortlisted for the Hugo Award for Best Novel, except that Pratchett withdrew it, as he felt stress over the award would mar his enjoyment of the Worldcon. This was the first time Pratchett had been shortlisted for either award.

Plot
As with many of the Discworld novels, the story takes place in Ankh-Morpork, a powerful city-state based on the historical and modern settings of various metropolises like London or New York City. The protagonist of the story is Moist von Lipwig, a skilled con artist who was to be hanged for his crimes, but saved at the last moment by the cunning and manipulative Patrician Havelock Vetinari, who has Moist's death on the scaffold faked.

In his office, Vetinari then presents Moist with two options: he may accept a job offer to become Postmaster of the city's rundown Postal Service or he may choose to walk out of the door and never hear from Vetinari again. As exiting through the door in question would lead to a fatal drop, Moist decides to accept the job.

After a thwarted attempt at escape, Moist is brought to the Post Office by his parole officer Mr Pump, a golem. It turns out that the Post Office has not functioned for decades, and the building is full of undelivered mail, concealed under a layer of pigeon dung. Only two employees remain: the aged Junior Postman Tolliver Groat and his assistant Stanley Howler.

Meanwhile, Vetinari is holding a meeting with the board executives of the Grand Trunk Company, a company that owns and operates a system of visual telegraph towers known as "clacks". He notes that since they have taken full control, the quality of service had gone down considerably. Despite unnerving most of the board, Vetinari fails to make headway, especially with its chairman, Reacher Gilt. It is rumored that, from his penthouse office in Tump Tower, Reacher Gilt plans to usurp Vetinari as Patrician.

As Moist attempts to revitalise the postal service, he discovers that over the few months before taking the job, a number of his predecessors have predeceased in the building within weeks of each other in unusual circumstances. He also discovers that the mail inside the building has taken on a life of its own, and is nearly suffocated as a result.

Moist introduces postage stamps to Ankh-Morpork, hires golems to deliver the mail, and finds himself competing against the Grand Trunk Clacks line. He meets and falls in love with the chain-smoking, golem-rights activist, Adora Belle Dearheart, and the two begin a relationship by the end of the book. Dearheart is the daughter of the Clacks founder Robert Dearheart, though the company was taken away from her father and the other founders by tricky financial manoeuvring. She still has useful contacts amongst the clacks operators.

The unscrupulous Clacks chairman, Reacher Gilt, sets a banshee assassin (Mr Gryle) on the Postmaster, but only manages to burn down much of the Post Office building. The banshee dies when he is flipped onto the space-warping sorting machine. Lipwig makes an outrageous wager that he can deliver a message to Genua, 2000 miles from Ankh-Morpork, faster than the Grand Trunk can. "The Smoking Gnu", a group of clacks-crackers, sets up a plan to send 'the woodpecker' (a Discworld equivalent to a killer poke) into the clacks system that will destroy the machinery, halting the message that Lipwig will race against. Lipwig talks the Gnu out of it, wanting to leave the semaphore towers standing. Instead, Lipwig and the Gnu, using Trunk documents in Adora Belle's possession, intercept the message and replace it with a message from the dead which serves as a confession of guilt by the Trunk. This plan succeeds.

Gilt is soon arrested and finds himself in front of the Patrician, offered a similar choice to the one Moist faced in the beginning of the book: run the mint or exit the room. Gilt, however, chooses to walk through the door to his death.

Characters
 Moist von Lipwig
 Mr. Pump
 Adora Belle Dearheart
 Robert Dearheart
 John Dearheart
 Lord Vetinari
 Tolliver Groat
 Stanley Howler (the name echoes Stanley Gibbons, the philately organisation)
 Reacher Gilt
George Aggy
Albert Spangler (briefly)
Anghammarad
Daniel "One Drop" Trooper
Gladys
Grandad
Mr Gryle
Iodine Maccalariat
Ladislav Pelc
Sacharissa Cripslock

Themes
 Postal services
 Government services
 Corporate takeovers
 Human rights activists
 Collectors
 Hackers
 Currency valuation
 Public relations (PR)
 Redemption
 Hope

The post office building is modelled on New York's monumental James Farley Post Office Building, which carries the inscription from Herodotus "Neither snow nor rain nor heat nor gloom of night stays these couriers from the swift completion of their appointed rounds."—in the novel this becomes "NEITHER RAIN NOR SNOW NOR GLO M OF NI  T CAN STAY THESE MES ENGERS ABO T THEIR DUTY" (some letters having been stolen).

TV adaptation
Sky One produced a two-part television film, Terry Pratchett's Going Postal, which aired on 30–31 May 2010.

References

External links

 
 Information from L-Space.org
 Going Postal at Worlds Without End

Discworld books
2004 British novels
2004 fantasy novels
British novels adapted into films
Doubleday (publisher) books
Novels about postal systems
British comedy novels
British novels adapted into television shows